Mbarika Fall (born 9 December 1970 in Saint-Louis, Senegal) is a Senegalese former basketball player who competed in the 2000 Summer Olympics.

References

1970 births
Living people
Sportspeople from Saint-Louis, Senegal
Senegalese women's basketball players
Olympic basketball players of Senegal
Basketball players at the 2000 Summer Olympics